Nevillea is a group of plants in the Restionaceae described as a genus in 1984. The entire genus is endemic to Cape Province in South Africa.

 Species
 Nevillea obtusissimus (Steud.) H.P.Linder
 Nevillea singularis Esterh.
 Nevillea vlokii H.P.Linder

References

Restionaceae
Endemic flora of South Africa
Flora of the Cape Provinces
Fynbos
Poales genera